Yaucourt-Bussus is a commune in the Somme department in Hauts-de-France in northern France.

Geography
The commune is situated 8 kilometres (5 mi) east of Abbeville, on the D153 road

Population

See also
Communes of the Somme department

References

Communes of Somme (department)